In functional analysis, a state of an operator system is a positive linear functional of norm 1. States in functional analysis generalize the notion of density matrices in quantum mechanics, which represent quantum states, both . Density matrices in turn generalize state vectors, which only represent pure states.  For M an operator system in a C*-algebra A with identity, the set of all states of M, sometimes denoted by S(M),  is convex, weak-* closed in the Banach dual space M*. Thus the set of all states of M with the weak-* topology forms a compact Hausdorff space, known as the state space of M .

In the C*-algebraic formulation of quantum mechanics, states in this previous sense correspond to physical states, i.e. mappings from physical observables (self-adjoint elements of the C*-algebra) to their expected measurement outcome (real number).

Jordan decomposition 

States can be viewed as noncommutative generalizations of probability measures.

More generally, the GNS construction shows that every state is, after choosing a suitable representation, a vector state.

A bounded linear functional on a C*-algebra A is said to be self-adjoint if it is real-valued on the self-adjoint elements of A. Self-adjoint functionals are noncommutative analogues of signed measures.

The Jordan decomposition in measure theory says that every signed measure can be expressed as the difference of two positive measures supported on disjoint sets. This can be extended to the noncommutative setting.

It follows from the above decomposition that A* is the linear span of states.

Some important classes of states

Pure states
By the Krein-Milman theorem, the state space of M has extreme points. The extreme points of the state space are termed pure states and other states are known as mixed states.

Vector states
For a Hilbert space H and a vector x in H, the equation ωx(A) := ⟨Ax,x⟩ (for A in B(H) ), defines a positive linear functional on B(H). Since ωx(1)=||x||2, ωx is a state if ||x||=1. If A is a C*-subalgebra of B(H) and M an operator system in A, then the restriction of ωx to M defines a positive linear functional on M. The states of M that arise in this manner, from unit vectors in H, are termed vector states of M.

Faithful states
A state  is faithful, if it is injective on the positive elements, that is,  implies .

Normal states

Tracial states
A tracial state is a state  such that

For any separable C*-algebra, the set of tracial states is a Choquet simplex.

Factorial states
A factorial state of a C*-algebra A is a state such that the commutant of the corresponding GNS representation of A is a factor.

See also
Quantum state
Gelfand–Naimark–Segal construction
Quantum mechanics
Quantum state
Density matrix

References

 

Functional analysis
C*-algebras